Daniel Oscar Garnero (born 1 April 1969) is an Argentine football manager and former player who played as a midfielder. He is the current manager of Libertad.

Career 
Garnero played most of his career for Club Atlético Independiente. He also made a short spell in Chilean football with Universidad Católica, and Mexico with Toros Neza.

Coaching career 
After retiring as a player, Garnero became the assistant manager to Jorge Burruchaga at Arsenal de Sarandí. He has also held coaching positions at Estudiantes de La Plata and Independiente. In July 2008 he was appointed as manager of Arsenal de Sarandí as replacement for Gustavo Alfaro. On 25 April 2009 he was sacked as manager of Arsenal de Sarandi. On 20 May 2010 was named as Independiente's new coach, the former Diablos Rojos player replaces Americo Gallego, who left the club a few days ago.
On 21 September 2010 Independiente have parted ways with coach Daniel Garnero by mutual consent, just four months after he took over from Americo Gallego at the Argentine giants.

Managerial statistics

References

External links
 
 

1969 births
Living people
People from Lomas de Zamora
Argentine footballers
Argentine expatriate footballers
Association football midfielders
Club Atlético Independiente footballers
Club Deportivo Universidad Católica footballers
Argentine Primera División players
Chilean Primera División players
Liga MX players
Expatriate footballers in Chile
Expatriate footballers in Mexico
Argentine football managers
Club Atlético Independiente managers
Arsenal de Sarandí managers
Club Atlético Banfield managers
Toros Neza footballers
Club Olimpia managers
Club Sol de América managers
Club Libertad managers
Argentine expatriate football managers
Sportspeople from Buenos Aires Province